Sakineh Simin M. Redjali (born 1934 is an Iranian–American psychologist and author. Simin Redjali was the first female professor of National University of Iran.

Biography
Simin Redjali was born in Tehran, Iran to an old aristocrat family. Her father, Ali Reza, and her mother Fatemeh, were titled by the Shah of Persia as Jalaelmolk and Sharafatdole, both honors of the government. Simin Redjali's grandfather, Haji Mirza Mohammed Taghi Dabir-al- Doleh was a member of Dar-al-Shora Kobra (council of Ministers) and an able servant of Naser al-Din Shah Qajar's court.

Education

PhD in Education/Clinical Psychology and Sociology with High Honors magna cumlade University of Heidelberg, Heidelberg, Germany 1961 
Post-Doctoral Fellowship University of London 1963. 
National Science Foundation Fellowship in Psychology University of Michigan, 1966.
Fulbright Scholar, University of Illinois, Chicago Circle and University of Pittsburgh, 
Research Program in Psychology and Programmed Learning, 1967.  
B. A., University of Tehran, Educational Science and philosophy, 1955.  
License, Clinical Psychology, Nursing Home Administrator, Commonwealth of Virginia

Work history

1996–2009 Dr. Redjali conducted research and provided consulting in the field of Mental Health, Developmental Disabilities, Behavioral Science and dual diagnosis. She evaluated existing health and education facilities, identified defects, waste, shortcomings and provided solutions for them including outcome measurements and programs for improvement. Reviewed and evaluated state grants for NIMH.
1992–1996 Clinical Faculty, Psychiatry Dept., Medical College of VA, Richmond, VA.
1995–1996 Director, Staff Development and Research, Northern VA Mental Health Institute, Falls Church, VA.  Developed, coordinated and delivered a variety of staff development, clinical and non-clinical training and research programs at the Institute.  Collaborated with universities, colleges, and other interested organizations for student internships and joint research programs.
1992–1995 Research Director, Central VA Training Center, Lynchburg, VA.   Planned, developed, organized and directed clinical research programs to improve the life and service delivery system for persons with mental retardation and developmental disabilities.  Collaborated with universities, colleges, and other interested organizations for joint research programs.  Chaired the Research Review Committee for Human Research and provided technical assistance to CVTC staff and research activities.
1979–1992 Center Director of Child Development Center and Adult Training Center, (Training Center Program Director), Central Virginia Training Center, Lynchburg, VA.   Planned the conceptual development and structured process of Resident's Care, Habilitative and Program Services for about 300 developmentally disabled persons according to intermediate care, accreditation and certification standards.  Directed and chaired Quality Assurance Committee.
1973–1979 President, Shemiran College, Shemiran, Iran.  Accredited college with faculties in Early Childhood Education, Family Counseling and Welfare Administration.   Developed programs in conjunction with the University of Syracuse, planned, directed curriculum development and academic standards; and was responsible for recruiting, international relations, general administrative duties, budgeting, fund raising and supervising 150 staff and enrollment of 1,200 students.
1963–1979 Professor of Psychology, National University of Iran, Tehran, Iran.  Taught General, Social, Educational and Clinical Psychology and conducted several studies and research, and served as Director of Testing and Psychotherapy of the University Hospital.
1969–1971 Secretary General, Women's Organization of Iran, Tehran, Iran.  Originated and established 180 Family Welfare Centers throughout Iran.  Duties included planning, budgeting, training, supervising and directing 180 branches and 60 organizations, and conducting research in women's studies.

Honors and awards

1996– Fellow, American Association of Intellectual and Developmental Disabilities (AAIDD, former AAMR); for meritorious contributions to the field of intellectual and developmental disabilities.  
1998–2000 board of directors Member, Virginia Chapter of American Association on Mental Retardation.
1992–1996 Clinical Associate, South Eastern Rural Mental Health Research Center, University of Virginia.
1992–1996 Clinical Faculty, Psychiatry Dept., Medical College of Virginia, Richmond, VA.
1985–2005 Service Award, Common Wealth of Virginia (1984, 1989, and 1994); several certificates and awards for volunteer services in the community.
1977– Pahlavi Medal, Proposed by the ministry of Higher Education for Excellence of Academic Achievement of Shemiran College.
1973– Taj and Haftpaykar medals for 19 years of volunteer services to the Special Education for the needed children. 
1971– The 2500th anniversary Medal of the Iranian Monarch for the research in the role of women in education and women studies.
1966– National Science Foundation Fellowship for Psychology, University of Michigan.
1962– 63 Cento Fellowship, a post-doctoral special course, University of London, Institute of Education.
1956–61 Academic Scholarship, granted for being a top student to study at the University of Heidelberg Germany.

Publications and papers
Redjali, S.M. and Butkus, S., Paper Presentation of a research on Family Perception of Services to Persons with Mental Retardation at the 119 Annual Meeting of the American Association on Mental Retardation, San Francisco, California, 1 June 1995. 
Redjali, S.M. and Lewis, R.E. From Institution to Community-Based/Care:  What Happens to Elderly Clients with Mental Illnesses or Mental Retardation? The Digest, Vol. 14, No. 21, Journal of Association of Public Developmental Disabilities, July 1995.  This study was presented at the 117th Annual Meeting of the American Association of Mental Retardation 1992 and at the 45th Scientific Association of the Gerontological Society of America 1992.
Redjali, S. M. and Radick, J. A New Residential Services Model, General ICF: An Alternative for Older ICF/MR Residents with Geriatric Care Needs, Journal of Mental Retardation, Vol. 26, No. 4, August 1988.
Redjali, S. M. Education System of Iran, The Encyclopedia of Comparative Education and National Systems of Education, Pergamon Press, Pages 364–369, 1987.			
Redjali, S. M. Education System of Iran, The International Encyclopedia of Education, Pergamon Press, Vol. 5, Pgs. 2697–2702, 1985. 
Redjali, S.M. Readings in Psychology, Shemiran College Press, 1978.  
Redjali, S.M. The Application of Psychology in the Field of Early Childhood Education, Journal of Psychology of the Iranian Psychological Association  (I.P.A.) Nos. 11 and 12, 1977.
Redjali, S.M. The Education Corps in Iran: A New Experiment in the Expansion of Education, Published in the World Yearbook of Education of Teachers College, Columbia University, New York, by Evans Brothers, Ltd., London, 1965.page 406
Redjali, S. M. Research Project for Creating Group Intelligence Test for Iranian Children, Shemiran College, 1977–1979.
Redjali, S. M. The Role of Women in Education in Iran, Madrid, 1970. published in Iran and the West: a critical bibliography page 881-History, by Sirus  Ghani 1987
Redjali, S. M. Psychology of Teachers, National University of Iran Press, 1969. (A Comparative Study)
Redjali, S. M. Behavior Therapy or Psychoanalysis, Journal of Mental Health, No. 97, 1965.
Redjali .S. M. International Directory of psychologist of the USA-Page 231, biography and Auto biography, 1963, Sorbonne, Paris.
Redjali, S. M. Wie Gestalten Die Studierenden der Deutsche  Geisteswissenschaftlichen Fakultaeten der Gegenwart Ihr Studium, Eine Untersuchung an der Universitate Heidelberg, Ein Beitrag Zur Hochschulreform.  Ruperto Carola, Heidelberg, Germany, 1961. in German.

References

1934 births
Living people
Academic staff of Shahid Beheshti University
Iranian expatriate academics
Iranian emigrants to the United States
Iranian psychologists
Iranian women psychologists
Iranian democracy activists
University of Michigan fellows
Virginia Commonwealth University faculty